Japheth Kimutai (born December 20, 1978, in Lelmokwo, Nandi District) is a Kenyan middle-distance runner who specialized in 800 metres.

In 1998 he won the gold medal at the Kuala Lumpur Commonwealth Games in a time of 1:43.82.  In the same year he won the African Championships 800 metres in Dakar, Senegal. He finished fourth at the 1998 IAAF World Cup

In 1999 he won gold at the All-Africa Games.

In 2000 in Sydney for the Olympic Games Japheth failed to reach the final despite running the quickest time by a Kenyan in the games.

He had started his career brightly when in 1994 he won the silver medal at the World Junior Championships and then in 1997 when still a Junior set the World junior record in the 800 metres in a time of 1:43.64 in Zürich on August 13, 1997. The world junior record was beaten by Abubaker Kaki of Sudan in 2008.

Achievements

References

External links

1978 births
Living people
Kenyan male middle-distance runners
Athletes (track and field) at the 1998 Commonwealth Games
Athletes (track and field) at the 2002 Commonwealth Games
Athletes (track and field) at the 2000 Summer Olympics
Olympic athletes of Kenya
Commonwealth Games gold medallists for Kenya
People from Nandi County
Commonwealth Games medallists in athletics
African Games gold medalists for Kenya
African Games medalists in athletics (track and field)
Athletes (track and field) at the 1999 All-Africa Games
20th-century Kenyan people
Medallists at the 1998 Commonwealth Games